Herbert John Clements (18 January 1882 – 18 September 1954) was an  Australian rules footballer who played with St Kilda in the Victorian Football League (VFL).

References

External links 

1882 births
1954 deaths
Australian rules footballers from Victoria (Australia)
St Kilda Football Club players